Construction is a movement created by Amr Al-Shobaki that will run in the 2015 Egyptian parliamentary election. Al-Shobaki was previously involved in the Egyptian Wafd Alliance. The Reform and Renaissance Party joined the movement on 19 February 2015.

References

2015 establishments in Egypt
Political party alliances in Egypt
Politics of Egypt